Audrey Bruneau (born 21 September 1992 in Clichy-la-Garenne, France) is a French handball player. She plays on the French national team, and participated at the 2011 World Women's Handball Championship in Brazil.

References

1992 births
Living people
French female handball players